Though webcomics are typically published primarily on the World Wide Web, some webcartoonists may get publishing deals in which comic books are created of their work. Sometimes, these books are published by mainstream comics publishers who are traditionally aimed at the direct market of regional comic books. Some webcartoonists may pursue print syndication in established newspapers or magazines. In other cases, webcomic creators decide to self-publish their work. Crowdfunding through Kickstarter is often used in order to fund such projects.

Publication of webcomics

Though mainstream comic book publishers have typically been wary of licensing webcomics and adapting them into a print format, the rise of webcomics in the 2000s coincided with an American boom in graphic novels. Anna Baddeley, writing for The Guardian, stated that the established fanbase many webcomics have could give publishers a chance to attract new audiences to the print format, making webcomics an attractive focus for publishers. The traditional audience base for webcomics and print comics are vastly different, and webcomic readers do not necessarily go to bookstores. For some webcartoonists, a print release may be considered the "goal" of a webcomic series, while for others, comic books are "just another way to get the content out."

Caitlin Rosberg, writing for Paste Magazine, noted that "digital-first" comics, as found on platforms such as ComiXology, Marvel Unlimited and DC Comics' Digital First, share more aspects with printed comics than with webcomics. With the exception of two-page spreads and the occasional large-panel layout, the formatting of such digital comics are indistinguishable from their print counterparts. "Digital-first" comics can almost seamlessly transition from screen to print, as they are designed with this leap in platform in mind. Rosberg claimed that such comics are not webcomics, as webcomics are designed for consumption only on the World Wide Web, often using infinite canvas techniques or uncommon page formats. Similarly, Lauren Davis wrote for Comics Alliance that "webcomics are not print comics that happen to appear on the web. They're a distinct animal, offer a distinct reading experience, and should be evaluated accordingly."

Webcomics have been seen by some artists as a potential new path towards syndication in newspapers, but attempts have rarely proven lucrative. According to Jeph Jacques (Questionable Content), "there's no real money" in syndication for webcomic artists. For instance Jeffrey Rowland uploaded his webcomics to the internet in order to gain constructive criticism after being rejected from various syndicates in 1999, but eventually found that he didn't need to get his work syndicated when he started selling merchandise of his webcomic Wigu. To The Boston Globe, Rowland said that "if a syndicate came to me and offered me a hundred newspapers, I would probably say no ... I'd probably make less money, with more work." When Diesel Sweeties found syndication by United Media in 2007, its creator Richard Stevens still made 80% of his income through his website. Other webcomic creators, such as R. K. Milholland (Something Positive) and Michael Terracciano (Dominic Deegan), wouldn't be able to syndicate their work in newspaper because they fill up a specific niche and wouldn't be accepted by a broader audience. Some webcartoonists have proven more successful with newspaper syndication since: in 2015, Dana Simpson syndicated her webcomic Phoebe and Her Unicorn through Universal Uclick to over 100 newspapers.

Many authors opt to self-publish their webcomic in print. In order to do so, many comic artists may use the crowdfunding service Kickstarter, which successfully funded 994 comic and graphic novel projects in 2015.

Published webcomics

In 1996, David Allen launched Plan Nine Publishing, a small press American publisher focused on printing webcomics. The first webcomic Plan Nine published was Bill Holbrook's Kevin and Kell. Plan Nine published over 70 titles, printing late 1990s and early 2000s webcomics such as Sluggy Freelance, Ozy and Millie, Greystone Inn, and College Roomies from Hell!!!. Since 1997, various webcomic creators worldwide have made book deals with larger publishing companies, resulting in their webcomics being adapted into comic books and distributed to retailers.

Webcomics syndicated in newspapers and magazines
Some webcomics have been regularly published in periodicals such as newspapers and magazines.

Collected works
From 2004 to 2011, graphic novel author and illustrator Kazu Kibuishi edited the comics anthology series Flight. Published by Image Comics and Ballantine Books, Flight featured short comics by various artists who had varying audiences online. The third book in Ted Rall's Attitude series, subtitled "The New Subversive Online Cartoonists" (2006), features interviews with and strips of 21 different webcartoonists.

Notes

References

Print